Martha station is a train station in Martha, Tennessee, serving Nashville's regional rail line, the Music City Star. Service began September 18, 2006.

References

External links
Station from Powell Grove Road from Google Maps Street View

Buildings and structures in Wilson County, Tennessee
Music City Star stations
Railway stations in the United States opened in 2006
2006 establishments in Tennessee